Fazlul Karim is a male Muslim given name, meaning bounty of the Generous One. Bearers of the name include:

Sheikh Fazlul Karim (1882–1936), Bangladeshi poet and writer
Fazlul Karim (lawyer) (1905-1986), Bangladeshi lawyer, businessman, politician and soldier
Fazlul Karim (academician) (1925–2014), scholar, academic, philosopher and essayist in Bangladesh
Fazlul Karim (scholar) (1935-2006), Bangladeshi scholar and Islamist politician
Sheikh Fazlul Karim, Selim (born 1947), known as Sheikh Selim, member of parliament, Bangladesh

Arabic masculine given names